Om Yentieng is the head of Cambodia's anti-corruption unit.

References

External links
YouTube.com

Cambodian law enforcement officers
Living people
Year of birth missing (living people)